The Women's high jump event  at the 2007 European Athletics Indoor Championships was held on March 2–3.

Medalists
 
Note: Venelina Veneva (Bulgaria) originally took the bronze with 1.96 m but was later disqualified after testing positive for testosterone.

Results

Qualification
Qualification: Qualification Performance 1.96 (Q) or at least 8 best performers advanced to the final.

Final

References
Results

High jump at the European Athletics Indoor Championships
High
2007 in women's athletics